Sunrisers Hyderabad (SRH) are a franchise cricket team based in Hyderabad, India, which plays in the Indian Premier League (IPL). They were one of the eight teams that competed in the 2016 Indian Premier League, their fourth outing in the competition. The team was captained by David Warner and coached by Tom Moody with Muttiah Muralitharan as bowling coach and VVS Laxman as mentor. They started their campaign against Royal Challengers Bangalore on 12 April 2016 on a losing note but went on to win their first IPL title, beating the same opposition in the final on 29 May 2016 by 8 runs. In the process, they became the first team to win both, the Eliminator match and Qualifier 2 before winning the final. Ben Cutting was declared the man of the match in the final and Mustafizur Rahman was declared as the emerging player of the season. Bhuvneshwar Kumar won the Purple Cap for taking 23 wickets in this IPL.

Administration and support staff

 Owner – Kalanithi Maran (Sun Network)
 Head coach – Tom Moody
 Assistant coach – Simon Helmot
 Bowling coach – Muttiah Muralitharan
 Mentor – VVS Laxman
 Source :

Kit Manufacturers and Sponsors

Players Auction 

The players auction for the 2016 Indian Premier League held in Bangalore on 6 February 2016. All eight franchises had participated in the auction. SRH has retained 15 players and released 9 players from the previous season. Due to this effort SRH Spent  and kept the balance  Added 10 players to the team.

Retained Players: David Warner, Shikhar Dhawan, Ashish Reddy, Naman Ojha, Eoin Morgan, Karn Sharma, Moises Henriques, Kane Williamson, Trent Boult, Ricky Bhui, Bhuvneshwar Kumar, Siddarth Kaul, Bipul Sharma

Released Players: Dale Steyn, Kevin Pietersen, Ishant Sharma, Praveen Kumar, Chama Milind, Hanuma Vihari, Ravi Bopara, Padmanabhan Prasanth and Laxmi Ratan Shukla

Added Players: Yuvraj Singh, Ashish Nehra, Ben Cutting, Tirumalasetti Suman, Deepak Hooda, Mustafizur Rahman , Aditya Tare, Barinder Sran, Vijay Shankar and Abhimanyu Mithun

Traded Players: KL Rahul, Parveez Rasool

Squad 
 Players with international caps are listed in bold.

Standings

Match summary

Results by match

Fixtures

League Stage

Playoff Stage

Eliminator

Qualifier 2

Final

Statistics 

Full Table on Cricinfo
 Last updated: 26 Oct 2017

Awards and achievements

Awards
 Man of the Match

Season Awards
 Champions of the 2016 Indian Premier League
 Winner of 2016 Fair Play Award
 Winner of Purple Cap: Bhuvneshwar Kumar
 Emerging player of the season: Mustafizur Rahman
 Ball of the tournament: Mustafizur Rahman
 Vitara Brezza Glam Shot of the Season: David Warner
 Source :

Achievements
 Biggest six of the tournament : Ben Cutting
 Yes bank maximum : David Warner
 Most Fours scored : David Warner
 Most Dot Balls Bowled : Bhuvneshwar Kumar

Reaction
The 2016 season performances helped the IPL see its brand value jump by 19% to the estimated value of 4.16 billion. The SunRisers also saw the increase in their brand value by 17% to 41 million in 2016, according to Duff & Phelps.

See also
List of Sunrisers Hyderabad records

References

External links
Sunrisers Hyderabad official website

Sunrisers Hyderabad seasons
Cricket in Hyderabad, India
2016 Indian Premier League